Eifo HaYeled (lit. "where's the kid") is an Israeli rock band formed in 1986 in Givat Brenner that influenced the Israeli rock scene and culture greatly. They broke up in 1998 and reformed in 2008.

They were considered one of the best rock bands of the 90s in Israel.

Band members
Hemi Rudner - lead vocals, bass guitar
Asaf Sarig - vocals, guitar
Asaf Meroz - drums
Ofir Bar-Ami - vocals, guitar
Arad Shiff - guitar

Discography

Albums

Zman Sukar, זמן סוכר (Sugar Time), 1993.
Shedim, שדים (Demons), 1994.
Mas'otay Im Atzmi, מסעותיי עם עצמי (My Journeys with Myself), 1995.
Eifo HaYeled?, איפה הילד? (Where is the Child?), 1996. Dedicated to Yitzhak Rabin
Bnei Hamea Haesrim, בני המאה ה-20 (Members of the 20th Century), 2012
Matok Bahasheha, מתוק בחשיכה (Sweet in the Dark), 2017

Compilations
Mishehu Shomea Oti, מישהו שומע אותי (Somebody Hears Me) 1998.

References

Israeli rock music groups